McCann Point is a point marking the east side of the mouth of Beaver Glacier, Antarctica, where the latter enters the Ross Ice Shelf. It was named by the Advisory Committee on Antarctic Names for K.A. McCann, Master of the  during U.S. Navy Operation Deep Freeze 1965.

References

Headlands of the Ross Dependency
Shackleton Coast